Lorho S. Pfoze is an Indian politician from Manipur. In 2019 Indian general election Lorho as a candidate of Naga People's Front got elected as Member of Parliament, Lok Sabha in the Outer Manipur (Lok Sabha constituency)

References

India MPs 2019–present
Lok Sabha members from Manipur
Living people
Naga People's Front politicians
Year of birth missing (living people)
People from Manipur